Bogdan Barbu (born 27 May 1980 in Braşov) is a rally driver from Romania. He made his rallying debut in 2005. In 2006 he won the 9th place in the Group H, 3rd place in the Class H3 and first place in the Novice Competition of the Romanian Hill Climbing Championship. In 2008 he participates in the Romanian Rally Championship driving a Renault Clio. After the first 4 rallies he occupies the first place in the novice competition.

External links
Bogdan Barbu at Autorally.ro

1980 births
Living people
Sportspeople from Brașov
Romanian rally drivers